Mazagran is a town and commune in Mostaganem Province, Algeria. It is located in Hassi Mamèche District. According to the 1998 census it has a population of 15,120. It is noted for its drinkware used to drink coffee.

See also
 Battle of Mazagran

References

Communes of Mostaganem Province